Steve McMahon (born 1961), English international football player and manager.

Steve McMahon may also refer to:

 Steve McMahon (footballer, born 1970), Scottish football defender or forward with clubs in England, Scotland and China
 Steve McMahon (footballer, born 1984), English football player, son of Steve McMahon
 Steve McMahon (consultant), American lawyer and media consultant

See also
Stephen MacMahon, British-Australian academic
Stephen J. McMahon (1881–1960), United States Tax Court judge